In publishing, printers  are both companies providing printing services and individuals who directly operate printing presses.

Printers can include:

Newspaper printers, often owned by newspaper publishers
Magazine printers, usually independent of magazine publishers
Book printers, often not directly connected with book publishers
Postcard printers
Stationery printers
Packaging printers
Trade printers, who offer wholesale rates within the printing industry
Wide-format printers, who specialize in wide format prints, such as signs and banners
Printmakers, artists who create their artworks using printing

References

External links
Printing and publishing – Law Insider

Printing
Printing terminology
Publishing

de:Drucker (Beruf)
diq:Neşırxaney